Alicja Grabka (born ) is a Polish volleyball player. She is part of the Poland women's national volleyball team.

She participated in the  2017 FIVB Volleyball Women's U20 World Championship,  and 2018 FIVB Volleyball Women's Nations League.
On club level she played for E.Leclerc Radomka Radom.

References

External links 

 CEV profile
 FIVB profile

1998 births
Living people
Polish women's volleyball players
Place of birth missing (living people)